is a Prefectural Natural Park in central Kyōto Prefecture, Japan. The park flanks the  within the municipality of Nantan. Rurikei is a nationally designated Place of Scenic Beauty.

See also

 National Parks of Japan

References

Parks and gardens in Kyoto Prefecture
Places of Scenic Beauty
Nantan, Kyoto